The R2 is a line of Rodalies de Catalunya's Barcelona commuter rail service, operated by Renfe Operadora. It is a major north–south axis in the Barcelona metropolitan area, running from the southern limits of the province of Girona to the northern limits of the province of Tarragona, via Barcelona. North of Barcelona, the line uses the Barcelona–Cerbère railway, running inland through the Vallès Oriental region. South of Barcelona, it uses the conventional Madrid–Barcelona railway, running along the coast through the Garraf region. The R2 had an annual ridership of 33.6 million in 2016, achieving an average weekday ridership of 125,948 according to 2008 data, which makes it the busiest line of the Barcelona commuter rail service.

In 2009, it took over the service offered by Barcelona commuter rail service line , incorporating the branch lines to Barcelona–El Prat Airport and Barcelona's Estació de França. A new line scheme has been in operation ever since; the services starting or terminating at the airport run north towards Maçanet-Massanes and are designated R2 Nord ("North"), whilst the ones starting or terminating at Estació de Fraça run south towards Sant Vicenç de Calders and are designated R2 Sud ("South").

In the long-term future, it is projected to take over the R4 south of Barcelona, connecting the inland regions of the Barcelona metropolitan area.

History
The predecessor of the modern-day R2 started operating in 1989 as line 2 of Rodalies Barcelona, the Cercanías commuter rail system for the Barcelona area, created in the same year. Since its creation until 2009, the R2 had preserved its original line scheme with no branch lines, using only  and  stations as its northern and southern terminus, respectively. Due to the construction works of the new Sagrera railway station in Barcelona and the urban renewal project associated with it, the operational capacity at Sant Andreu Comtal railway station and its surroundings was restricted. On 31 January 2009, the R10, which linked Barcelona–El Prat Airport to Barcelona's Estació de França, suspended services. The R2 then took over the service offered by the R10, incorporating the branch lines to the airport and Estació de França, and a new line scheme came into service. The R10 was initially scheduled to resume services two years later.

Accidents and incidents

On 23 June 2010, twelve people were killed and fourteen were injured when an express train ran into them as they were crossing the line at  station.

On 28 July 2017, fifty-four people were injured when a R2 Sud train coming from  collided with a buffer stop at Barcelona's Estació de França terminus.

Infrastructure
Like the rest of Rodalies de Catalunya lines, the R2 runs on the Iberian gauge mainline railway system, which is owned by Adif, an agency of the Spanish government. All of the railway lines carrying Rodalies de Catalunya services are electrified at 3,000 volts (V) direct current (DC) using overhead lines. The trains on the line call at up to 34 stations, using the following railway lines, in order from south to north:

All of the infrastructure used by the R2 is shared with other services, except the section between Barcelona–El Prat Airport and El Prat de Llobregat stations, which is exclusively used by R2 Nord services. After Passeig de Gràcia, R2 Sud trains, together with the R13, R14, R15 and R16, as well as long-distance services, branch off to Barcelona's Estació de França, terminating there. The rest of R2 services continue northwards through the Aragó Tunnel, calling at El Clot-Aragó railway station, and share tracks with the R11 only. North of Mollet-Sant Fost railway station, Barcelona commuter rail service line  and several freight services join their route. The R8 terminates further north at  so that the R2 only shares tracks with the R11 and freight services from this point on.

Operation

Some of the services terminating at the airport also use Granollers Centre as their northern terminus. The rest of the services on the R2 run between Castelldefels and Granollers Centre, calling at all stations, so that they do not terminate neither at the airport nor at Estació de França. The first trains run about 5:00 in the morning, with the latest arriving at about 1:00 at night.

The designation of the services on the line depends on the route they operate. All services terminating at the airport are designated R2 Nord ("R2 North"), whilst the services terminating at Estació de França are designated R2 Sud ("R2 South"). The Nord and Sud designations refer to the fact that such services mostly run on the line's northern and southern portion, respectively. The through services between Castelldefels and Granollers Centre are simply designated R2.

, the service routes operating on the R2 are as follows:

The line's activity gathers on its southern section, between Vilanova i la Geltrú and Barcelona, where an approximate peak-time service frequency of 10 minutes is offered. All services on the line converge on the section between El Prat de Llobregat and Barcelona Passeig de Gràcia stations, where they together offer an approximate peak-time service frequency of 8 minutes. The overall service frequency reduces as the line moves away from Barcelona, especially on the section north of Sant Celoni, where R2 Nord services only operate during the morning rush hour or at night. During the rest of the day, this section is served by regional rail line . Moreover, the services between Castelldefels and Granollers Centre only run on weekdays.

, the approximate service frequencies on the R2 are as follows:

The trains used on the R2 are Civia—specifically, the 463, 464 and 465 Series, which consist of three, four and five cars per set, respectively, 447 Series, 450 Series and 451 Series electrical multiple units (EMU). The 450 and 451 Series are technically and aesthetically identical, differing only in the number of cars per set; the first consist of six cars, whilst the latter consist of three cars. Furthermore, they consist of double-decker cars, becoming the only type of bilevel rolling stock on the Rodalies de Catalunya system. The R2 is the only Rodalies de Catalunya line where 450 and 451 Series trains operate. Normally, the 450 Series runs only on R2 Sud services between Sant Vicenç de Calders and Barcelona's Estació de França, whilst the 451 Series runs only either on R2 Sud services between Vilanova i la Geltrú and Estació de França, or on R2 services between Castelldefels and Granollers Centre stations. Civia and 447 Series trains are used interchangeably on all R2, R2 Nord and R2 Sud services on the line. On average, the trains used on the line operate a total of 216 services every day on weekdays, accounting for a ridership of 125,948, according to 2008 data.

Future
The 2008–2015 Rail Infrastructure Master Plan for the Barcelona Commuter Rail Service, developed by the Spanish Ministry of Public Works and Transport, plans to establish a "coast-to-coast" and "inland-to-inland" line scheme. The R2 will become the "inland-to-inland" line, creating a new major south–north axis through the inland regions of the Barcelona metropolitan area. R2 trains will continue to use the Aragó Tunnel in central Barcelona with the new line scheme, which is currently not possible due to the configuration of the southern rail accesses to Barcelona Sants. A long-term project with an uncertain completion date, the new configuration would require multimillion-euro investments since it is associated with the construction of a new underground route in L'Hospitalet de Llobregat for the Rodalies de Catalunya lines running through the city as well as the new rail link for Barcelona–El Prat Airport.

As stated in the master plan, the proposed peak-time service frequencies for the future R2 would be as follows:

List of stations

The following table lists the name of each station served by line R2 in order from south to north; the station's service pattern offered by R2, R2 Nord and/or R2 Sud trains; the transfers to other Rodalies de Catalunya lines, including both commuter and regional rail services; remarkable transfers to other transport systems; the municipality in which each station is located; and the fare zone each station belongs to according to the Autoritat del Transport Metropolità (ATM Àrea de Barcelona) fare-integrated public transport system and Rodalies de Catalunya's own fare zone system for Barcelona commuter rail service lines.

Notes

References

Bibliography

External links
 Rodalies de Catalunya official website
 Schedule for the R2 (PDF format)
 Official Twitter accounts by Rodalies de Catalunya for lines R2, R2 Nord and R2 Sud with service status updates (tweets usually published only in Catalan)
 R2 (rodalia 2) on Twitter. Unofficial Twitter account by Rodalia.info monitoring real-time information about the R2 by its users.
 Information about the R2 at trenscat.cat 

2
Railway services introduced in 1989